Francesco Persiani (born 29 November 1965 in La Spezia) is an Italian politician.

Biography
Born in La Spezia, Liguria, he was raised in Verona and became a lawyer graduating at University of Florence. He has lived in Massa, Tuscany, since 1988. He opened his own law firm in Massa in 1995.

He ran for Mayor of Massa at the 2018 Italian local elections, supported by a centre-right coalition formed by Lega Nord, Forza Italia and Brothers of Italy. He won and took office on 26 June 2018.

See also
2018 Italian local elections
List of mayors of Massa

References

External links
 
 

1965 births
Living people
Mayors of Massa
People from Massa
Lega Nord politicians